Group A of the 1993 Federation Cup Americas Zone was one of four pools in the Americas zone of the 1993 Federation Cup. Four teams competed in a round robin competition, with the top two teams advancing to the play-offs.

Paraguay vs. Colombia

Guatemala vs. Bahamas

Paraguay vs. Guatemala

Paraguay vs. Bahamas

Colombia vs. Guatemala

Colombia vs. Bahamas

See also
Fed Cup structure

References

External links
 Fed Cup website

1993 Federation Cup Americas Zone